The Hills Have Thighs is a 2010 American made for cable erotic film written and directed by Jim Wynorski under the pseudonym Salvadore Ross. It is based on the 1977 horror feature The Hills Have Eyes written and directed by Wes Craven.

Plot
Linda and Mark find each other in the south Texas hill country. Being alone in the hills, they get to know one another and continue to explore each other as well as the surrounding country.

Cast
 Julie K. Smith as Linda
 Rebecca Love as Mira
 Brandin Rackley as Sandy
 Glori-Anne Gilbert as Glori-Anne
 Kylee Nash as Tara
 Dana Bentley as Mark
 Diana Terranova as Tanya
 Frankie Cullen as Ben
 Mark Weiler as Mike
 Paul Sterling as Bill

Production
The film was produced by the production companies People By The Pound and Oh boy, Foods! Inc.

Release
It was broadcast several times in Spring and Summer 2010 at fixed times and on demand on the premium channels HBO and Showtime.  James Cromer, a former South Carolina state representative, sued both HBO and Showtime when they promoted the film as his work but instead broadcast Wynorski's film.

References

External links
 

2010 television films
2010 films
American television films
American erotic horror films
Films directed by Jim Wynorski
The Hills Have Eyes
Pornographic parody films of horror films
2010s American films